Féret or Feret is a French family name that may refer to

 Charles James Féret (1854-1921), English editor and historian of Fulham
 Jean-Baptiste Féret (1753–1808), French publisher, founder of La Librairie Féret / Editions Féret
 his son Michel-Édouard Féret, co-author of the "Féret" 1846 i.e. Cocks & Féret wine guide
 Paul Féret (active 1984–?s), French tennis player
 René Féret (1860-1947), director of the Ponts et Chaussées Laboratory in Boulogne (destroyed in 1942), best known for the relationship between the water-cement ratio (w/c) and the compressive strength of the concrete
 René Féret (1945–2015), French film director and actor
 Marie Féret, French actress in Mozart's sister
 Julien Féret (born 1982), French footballer
 Daniel Féret (born 1944), Belgian politician, founder of the National Front

Other uses 
 Cocks & Féret, or Féret, the colloquial name of a Bordeaux wine created by Charles Cocks and Michel-Édouard Féret
 Feret diameter, a measure of an object size

See also
 Ferret (disambiguation)

French-language surnames